The Mountain Autonomous Soviet Socialist Republic or Mountain ASSR was a short-lived autonomous republic within the Russian SFSR in the Northern Caucasus that existed from 20 January 1921, to 7 July 1924.
The Mountainous Republic of the Northern Caucasus was created from parts of the Kuban and Terek Oblasts by the indigenous nationalities after the Russian Revolution; however, Soviet rule was installed on this territory after the Red Army conquered the Northern Caucasus in the course of the Russian Civil War, and the former republic was transformed into a Soviet one. It comprised six okrugs: Balkar, Chechen, Kabardian, Karachay, Nazran (Ingushetia), and Vladikavkaz Okrug (Ossetia) and had two cities: Grozny and Vladikavkaz. In addition, a special autonomy was provided to the Terek Cossacks: Sunzha Cossack Okrug, which included a large enclave in northern Ingushetia, and a smaller one bordering Grozny. Its boundaries approximated those of classical Zyx.

The ASSR did not exist in its original state very long. Already on 1 September 1921, Kabardin Okrug was split from the ASSR as separate Kabardin Autonomous Oblast, subordinated directly to the RSFSR. Next came Karachay Okrug, which was transformed into Karachay-Cherkess Autonomous Oblast on 12 January 1922; Balkar Okrug, which was merged with Kabardin AO into Kabardino-Balkarian Autonomous Oblast on 16 January 1922; and Chechen Okrug, which was transformed into the Chechen Autonomous Oblast on 30 November 1922.

By the Decree of the VTsIK of 7 July 1924, the remaining territory of the ASSR was partitioned into the North Ossetian Autonomous Oblast and the Ingush Autonomous Oblast. The Sunzha Cossack Okrug and the city of Vladikavkaz were directly subordinated to the VTsIK until 17 October 1924, when North Caucasus Krai was formed and integrated all of the former ASSR in addition to those two units.

In the 19th century, the best land in the region was given to Cossacks, Russian and Ukrainian military colonizers, while many natives were driven to the mountains. In 1920, the Soviet government decided to deport the Terek Cossacks and give their farms to the natives. A total of 34,637 individuals were deported to Vladikavkaz, Arkhangelsk and Donbas. Hundreds of families were later found to be supporters of the Soviet government. In January 1921, the forced resettlement of the Cossacks was stopped, and some families returned to occupy abandoned farms, but the densely-populated line of Tsarist-era military settlements was erased from the North Caucasus forever and the natives were free to occupy the fertile lands on the valley floors. In 1882, 24.7% of the Ingush lived in the mountains, but by 1924 only 2.1% did.

During the Cold War, many Western historians saw the disintegration of the Mountaineer Republic as a divide-and-conquer strategy by the Soviet government to keep the peoples of the Caucasus weak and subjugated to Moscow. The Soviet archives that became public in the 1990s have shown this not to be the case. The disintegration of the republic started in March 1921, just two months after its creation, when the leaders of Kabarda expressed their discontent at having been made part of the republic and cited the absence of economic links between the Kabards and other Mountaineer peoples. From April to June 1921, Kabarda held a congress at which 140 delegates, only 28 of the Bolsheviks, had overwhelmingly voted not just to become an autonomous oblast, but to also demand autonomous republic status. Joseph Stalin had to talk the leader of the Kabards, Betal Kalmykov, out of applying for a full union republic status.

References 

1921 establishments in Russia
1924 disestablishments in Russia
Autonomous republics of the Russian Soviet Federative Socialist Republic
Early Soviet republics
History of the North Caucasus
History of Chechnya
Chechen-speaking countries and territories
States and territories established in 1921
States and territories disestablished in 1924
Former socialist republics
Post–Russian Empire states